Buch-Sankt Magdalena is a municipality in the district of Hartberg-Fürstenfeld in Styria, Austria. It was formed on 1 January 2013 by the merger of the former municipalities Sankt Magdalena am Lemberg and Buch-Geiseldorf.

References

Cities and towns in Hartberg-Fürstenfeld District